Population structure may refer to many aspectsof population ecology:

 Population structure (genetics), also called population stratification
 Population pyramid
 Age class structure
 F-statistics
 Population density
 Population distribution
 Population dynamics
 Population genetics
 Population growth
 Population size

See also 
 Demography
 Population model
 :Category:Population